This is a list of foreign television channels available in Canada. The Canadian Radio-television and Telecommunications Commission (CRTC) regulates which television channels are allowed to air in Canada. Although the vast majority of television channels available in Canada are Canadian-owned and operated, the CRTC allows certain foreign-owned channels to be broadcast in Canada.

In order for a non-Canadian station/channel to broadcast in Canada it must first be listed by the CRTC on the List of non-Canadian programming services authorized for distribution.  Cable and satellite companies are only allowed to carry the foreign services that are contained in the list. Also, not every channel on the list is currently carried by BDUs, it is up to their discretion to decide what channels they are interested in offering to consumers.

On June 30, 2011, the CRTC introduced new policy whereby the 'lists of eligible satellite services' would be consolidated into one list to be known as the 'List of non-Canadian programming services authorized for distribution'.

List of non-Canadian programming services authorized for distribution
Although the CRTC has combined all stations/channels together, the list below has been separated into sections to distinguish between the various types of services that are contained in the list.  The sections are as follows: American over-the-air stations, American specialty channels & foreign specialty channels:

American free-to-air channels eligible for national distribution

Up to one channel from each network can be carried by a Class 1, 2, or 3 pay television provider that cannot receive an acceptable signal from that network.  As well, the CRTC has authorized most subscription companies to carry a second American network feed from another time zone on a discretionary basis.

Affiliations are as listed by the CRTC.

NBC:
WBTS-CD Nashua, NH/Boston1
WGRZ Buffalo
WPTZ Plattsburgh
WDIV Detroit
WICU-TV Erie
KARE Minneapolis
KHQ-TV Spokane
KING-TV Seattle
CBS:
WBZ-TV Boston
WIVB-TV Buffalo
WCAX-TV Burlington
WWJ-TV Detroit
WSEE-TV Erie
WTOL-TV Toledo
WCCO-TV Minneapolis
KREM Spokane
KIRO-TV Seattle
ABC:
WCVB-TV Boston
WKBW-TV Buffalo
WVNY Burlington
WXYZ-TV Detroit
WJET-TV Erie
KSTP-TV Minneapolis
KXLY-TV Spokane
KOMO-TV Seattle
PBS:
WGBH Boston
WNED-TV Buffalo
WETK Burlington
WTVS Detroit
WQLN Erie
KSPS-TV Spokane
KCTS-TV Seattle
Fox:
WFXT Boston
WUTV Buffalo
WFFF-TV Burlington
WJBK Detroit
WUHF Rochester
KAYU-TV Spokane
KCPQ Tacoma
Formerly distributed:
WHDH Boston (NBC)2
WFTC Minneapolis (Fox)3

1WBTS-CD (then WBTS-LD) was authorized for distribution by the CRTC on December 20, 2016, and replaced WHDH as the NBC affiliate on January 1, 2017. The authorization later transferred to the former WYCN-LD, which transmits a full-power signal to the Boston area using a channel share with WGBX-TV.
2WHDH's NBC affiliation expired on January 1, 2017, but the station still remains authorized for distribution.
3While listed by the CRTC as a Fox affiliate, WFTC (a current-day MyNetworkTV owned-and-operated station) has not served as such since 2002, when KMSP-TV became the Twin Cities O&O of Fox in September 2002. Since neither station has been carried in Canada since the affiliation change (in fact, it is not clear if WFTC was ever carried in Canada), there has been no reason to fix this "error" to date.

American Superstations eligible for national distribution

KSTW Tacoma/Seattle - (The CW)
KTLA-TV Los Angeles - (The CW)
KWGN-TV Denver - (The CW)
WGN-TV Chicago  - (IND)
WSBK-TV Boston  - (IND)
WPIX New York - (The CW) 
WPCH-TV Atlanta - (IND)
WUAB Lorain/Cleveland - (The CW)
WWOR-TV Secaucus, New Jersey/New York - (MyNetworkTV)

Foreign specialty channels

Note: All channels listed are authorized for distribution, with those in boldface type domestically available through cable, satellite, or IPTV services. However, some may not be carried by a provider due to lack of a carriage contract, low overall viewer interest, programming or rights conflicts with a domestic network, or other technical concerns. Some channels below or not listed here may also distribute their services through IPTV means direct to the consumer without CRTC intervention, and/or have no geoblocking restrictions for Canadian viewers to access their network streams.

1+1 International (Ukraine)
4K Heritage (United States)
1Music (Nigeria)
2M Maroc (Morocco)
2sTV (Senegal)
4E TV (Greece)
5 Kanal (Ukraine)
A3 (Algeria)
A+ Kids (United Kingdom)
Aaj Tak (India), a Canadian version is already on-air
AAJ News (Pakistan)
AAJ TV (Pakistan)
Aapka Colors (India)
Aastha Bhajan (India)
A Bola TV (Portugal)
A&E (United States)
ABP News (India)
ABO (United States)
Africa 24 (France)
Afro Sports (United States)
Afrotainment (United States)
Afrotainment Music (United States)
AksyonTV International (Philippines)
Al Arabiya (UAE)
Al Araby (United Kingdom)
Al Jadeed (Lebanon) (formerly New Sat)
Al Jazeera (Qatar)
Al Jazeera English (Qatar)
Alpha Sat (Greece)
AMC (United States), separate feed for Canada is broadcast
ANC (Philippines)
American Heroes Channel (United States) (formerly Military Channel)
Antena 3 Internacional (Spain)
Ariana Television (Afghanistan)
ART America (Egypt)
ART Movies (Egypt)
ATN News (Bangladesh)
ATV Home Channel (Hong Kong)
ARY Musik (Pakistan)
ARY News (Pakistan)
ARY Qtv (Pakistan)
ARY Zauq (Pakistan)
Asianet Plus (India)
AWE (United States)
AXS TV (United States) (formerly HDNet)
Az Mundo (Mexico)
BabyFirstTV (United States)
BabyTV (UK)
Band Internacional (Brazil)
Band News (Brazil)
Banglavision (Bangladesh)
BBC World News (UK) (BBC World North America feed)
Beijing TV (China)
beIN Sports en Español (United States)
Benfica TV (Portugal)
Berbère Télévision (France)
Bestseller (Russia)
BET (United States)
Big Ten Network (United States)
Bloomberg Television (United States)
Bridges TV (United States)
Business Plus (Pakistan)
BVN (Netherlands and Flanders)
C Music (England)
C-SPAN (United States)
C4 (New Zealand) (formerly TV4)
Cameroon Radio Television (CRTV) (Cameroon)
Canal+ International (France) (No longer exists)
Canal 2 International (Cameroon)
Canal 24 Horas (Spain)
Canal 52 MX (Mexico)
Canal Algérie (Algeria)
Canal de las Estrellas Latinoamérica (Mexico)
Canal Q (Portugal)
Canal SUR (United States)
Caracol TV Internacional (Colombia)
CaribVision (Barbados)
CBS Sports Network (United States, certain programming is blacked out)
CCTV-4 (China)
CCTV Entertainment (China)
CGTN (China) (formerly CCTV News)
CGTN Documentary (China) (formerly CCTV-9)
CGTN French (China) (formerly CCTV Français)
CEEN TV (Jamaica)
Centroamerica TV (United States)
Channel [V] (Taiwan)
Channel i (Bangladesh)
Channel One (Bangladesh) (No longer exists)
Channel One (Russia)
Charming China (China)
China Yellow River TV (China)
CincoMas (Spain)
Cine Bangla  (United States)
CineLatino (Mexico)
Cinema One Global (Philippines)
CNBC (United States)
CNN (United States)
CNN International (United States)
Comedy Central (United States)
Cubavision Internacional (Cuba)
Dandana TV (United States)
Dawn News (Pakistan)
De Película (Mexico)
Dragon TV (China)
Duck TV (Slovakia)
Duna World (Hungary)
DW (Deutsche+) (Germany)
DW English (Germany)
EbonyLife TV (Nigeria)
Ekushey TV (Bangladesh)
El Gourmet.com TV (Argentina)
English Club TV (United Kingdom)
Esperanza TV (United States)
ET Now (India)
ETTV Global (China)
ETV Bangla (India)
Eurochannel (France)
Euronews (France)
Eurosport News (France)
EWTN (United States)
FashionBox (USA)
FastnfunBox (Poland)
Filmbox Arthouse (Poland)
Fox Business Network (United States)
Fox Life (Argentina) (formerly Utilisima)
Fox News Channel (United States)
Fox Sports Racing (United States) (formerly Speed)
France 24 - Arabic (France)
France 24 - English (France)
France 24 - French (France)
Fujian Straits TV (SETV) (China)
FunboxUHD (USA)
Future Television (Lebanon)
GAC Living (United States) (formerly Ride TV)
Game Show Network (United States)
Gametoon Box (Poland)
Geo TV (Pakistan)
German Kino Plus (United States)
GMA Life TV (Philippines)
GMA News TV International (Philippines)
GMA Pinoy TV (Philippines)
Golf Channel (United States)
Gone Viral Music (Barbados)
Gone Viral TV (Barbados)
Gone Viral Vogue (Barbados)
Gone Viral X-treme (Barbados)
 Greek Cinema (Greece)
Great Wall Elite (China)
India Today (India)
Haiti HD (United States)
HIGH TV 3D (United States)
HLN (United States)
Hope Channel (United States)
Horizon Channel (Hong Kong)
HTV (United States)
HuffPost  Live (United States)
Hunan Satellite TV (China)
iROKO Play (Nigeria)
iROKO Plus (Nigeria)
Indus Music (Pakistan)
Indus Vision (Pakistan)
iTVN (Poland)
Jewelry Television (United States)
Jewish Life Television (United States)
Jiangsu International TV (China)
JUS 24x7 (United States)
JUS ONE (United States)
JUS Punjabi (United States)
JUS TV (United States)
K TV (India)
Kapatid TV5 (Philippines)
Kino Polska International (Poland)
Kino Polska Muzyka International (Poland)
KTO (France)
La7 (Italy)
LBC America (Lebanon)
Lifestyle Network (Philippines) (No longer exists)
Lifetime Television (United States), a Canadian version is already on-air
LUXE.TV (Luxembourg)
M6 International (France)
Masala TV (Pakistan)
MBC Drama (South Korea)
Medi 1 TV (Morocco)
Melody (France)
Mello TV (Jamaica)
Mexicanal (United States)
Mezzo (France)
MGG TV (France) (formerly ES1)
Milenio Television (Mexico)
Mirror Now (India)
MLB Network (United States)
Motors TV North AM (United Kingdom)
MSNBC (United States)
Museum (France)
Mult (Russia)
Multimedios Televisión (Mexico)
MTA International (United Kingdom)
MUTV (United Kingdom)
myZen.tv (France)
NASA TV (United States)
Nautical Channel (UK)
NDTV 24x7 (India)
NDTV Good Times (India)
NDTV India (India)
NDTV Profit (India)
Network Ten (Australia)
NetViet (Vietnam)
NFL Network (United States)
NHK World TV (Japan)
NTD TV (United States), a Canadian version is already on-air
Nippon TV (Japan)
Now BNC (Hong Kong)
Now Entertainment Channel (Hong Kong)
NTN24 (Colombia)
NTV Bangla (Bangladesh)
One America News Network (United States)
One Caribbean Television (United States)
OUI TV (United States)
Oxygen (United States)
Pac-12 Network (United States)
Paramount Network (United States, certain programming is blacked out)
Paris Première (France)
Peace TV (United Arab Emirates)
PeopleTV (United States)
PFC Internacional (Brazil)
Phoenix North America Chinese Channel (United States)
Phoenix InfoNews Channel (United States)
Planète+ (France), separate feed for Canada is broadcast
Planète+ Thalassa (France)
Playboy TV (United States)
Polsat 2 International (Poland)
ProSiebenSat.1 Welt (Germany), a Canadian version is already on-air
PTV Global (Pakistan)
Punjab TV (Pakistan)
QVC (United States)
Radiodiffusion Télévision Ivoirienne (RTI) (Ivory Coast)
Radio Télévision Guinéenne (RTG) (Guinea)
Radio Télévision du Sénégal (RTS) (Senegal)
Radio-Télévision nationale congolaise (RTNC) (Congo)
Rai Italia (Italy)
Rai News24 (Italy)
Rai World Premium (Italy)
RCN Nuestra Tele (Colombia)
Record Internacional (Brazil)
Revel TV 4K (France)
REVOLT (United States)
RIK Sat (Cyprus)
Ritmoson Latino (Mexico)
RTL International (Germany) (No longer exists)
RTP3 (Portugal)
RTP Açores Internacional (Portugal)
RTP Internacional (Portugal)
RTR Planeta (Russia)
RTV (Bangladesh)
RTV Palma (Serbia) (No longer exists)
Sahara One (India)
Sahara Samay (India)
Saint Pierre & Miquelon 1ère (France)
Seasons (France)
SET Asia (India), a Canadian version is already on-air
Shalom World (United States)
SIC Notícias (Portugal)
Sky News Arabia (United Arab Emirates)
Sky News International (United Kingdom)
Southern Television Guangdong (TVS Satellite) (China)
Sport Plus (Greece)
STAR Chinese Channel (Taiwan)
STAR Chinese Movies 2 (Taiwan)
STAR Gold (India)
Star International (Greece)
Star Plus (India)
Star Suvarna (India) (formerly Asianet Suvarna)
Star TVE HD (Spain)
Stingray Classica (Netherlands)
Stingray Djazz (Netherlands)
Stingray Festival 4K (Netherlands)
Studio Canal (France)
Sun TV (India)
Super Canale Caribe (Dominican Republic)
Telefe Internacional (Argentina)
Televisión Dominicana (United States)
The Africa Channel (United States)
The Filipino Channel (Philippines)
The Silent Network (Kaleidoscope) (United States) (No longer exists)
The Weather Channel (United States)
TL Novelas (Mexico)
TLC (United States)
TNT (Russia)
Trace TV (France)
Travelxp 4K (India)
TRT World (Turkey)
TruTV (United States)
Turner Classic Movies (United States), separate feed for Canada is broadcast
TV3 (Ireland)
TV3 (New Zealand)
TV Asia (United States)
TV Chile (Chile)
TV Land (United States)
TV Naija (United States)
TV Globo Internacional (Brazil)
TV Japan (United States)
TV Polonia (Poland)
TVE Internacional (Spain)
TVI 24 (Portugal)
TVI Ficção (Portugal)
TVI Internacional (Portugal)
TVRi (Romania)
Ukraine24 (Ukraine)
UTV Movies International (India)
WAPA America (United States)
WMNB-TV: Russian-American Broadcasting Company (United States)
WWE Network (United States)
Zaiqa TV (Pakistan)
Zhejiang International (China)

See also 
 List of television stations in Canada by call sign
 List of Canadian television networks (table)
 List of Canadian television channels
 List of Canadian specialty channels
 Discretionary service
 List of United States television stations available in Canada
 Digital television in Canada
 Multichannel television in Canada
 List of Canadian television stations available in the United States
 List of television stations in North America by media market

References

External links
CRTC List of non-Canadian programming Services

United States stations available in Canada
United States stations available in Canada
Television Canada